Exophyla is a genus of moths of the family Noctuidae.

Species
 Exophyla flexularis Mabille, 1890
 Exophyla melanocleis Hampson, 1926
 Exophyla molybdea Hampson, 1926
 Exophyla multistriata Hampson, 1910
 Exophyla platti Prout, 1925
 Exophyla poliotis Hampson, 1902
 Exophyla rectangularis Geyer, [1828]

References
 Exophyla  at Markku Savela's Lepidoptera and Some Other Life Forms
 Natural History Museum Lepidoptera genus database

Calpinae